Charles Ronald Hogan (born 10 January 1939) is a Scottish former first-class cricketer.

Hogan was born at Paisley in January 1939. A club cricketer for Ferguslie Cricket Club, Hogan made his debut for Scotland in first-class cricket against Ireland at Greenock in 1962. He played first-class cricket for Scotland a further five times, with his final appearance coming in 1964 on Scotland's tour of England against Warwickshire at Edgbaston. Playing in the Scottish side as a right-arm fast-medium bowler, he took 24 wickets at an average of 17.29; he took a five wicket haul on two occasions, both in 1963 with 5 for 48 against the Marylebone Cricket Club, and 6 for 36 against Ireland. As a lower order batsman, he scored 25 runs with a highest score of 7.

References

External links

1939 births
Living people
People from Paisley, Renfrewshire
Scottish cricketers